Presented below are lists of famous or notable Ukrainian people of Jewish descent and other Jews born in the territory of present-day Ukraine, before 20 century borderland region in Polish–Lithuanian Commonwealth (later in Russian Partition and Austrian Partition).

Athletes

Oksana Baiul, figure skater, Olympic gold
 Alexei Beletski, Ukrainian-born Israeli, ice dancer, Olympian
 Oleksii Bychenko, Ukrainian-born Israeli, figure skater, 2016 European silver medallist, Olympian
Artem Dolgopyat, Ukrainian-born Israeli, Olympic gold (artistic gymnast - floor) for Israel
 Olena Dvornichenko, Israel/Ukraine, rhythmic gymnastics
 Grigoriy Gamarnik, Ukrainian-born Soviet, world wrestling champion (Greco-Roman lightweight), world championship gold and silver
 Samuel Gerson, Ukrainian-born US, Olympic silver wrestling (freestyle featherweight)
 Natalia Gudina, Ukrainian-born Israeli, figure skater, Olympian
 Vadym Gutzeit (born 1971), saber fencer, Olympic champion, Youth and Sport Minister of Ukraine
Pavlo Ishchenko ("Wild Man"), Ukraine/Israel, bantamweight & lightweight boxer, 2x European Amateur Boxing Championships medalist, and European Games medalist
 Moisei Kas’ianik, Ukrainian-born USSR, world weightlifting champion
 Marina Kravchenko, Ukrainian-born Israeli, Soviet and Israel national table tennis teams
Lenny Krayzelburg, Ukrainian-born US swimmer, 4x Olympic champion (100 m backstroke, 200-m backstroke, twice 4x100-m medley relay); 3x world champion (100 m and 200-m backstroke, 4×100-m medley) and 2x silver (4×100-m medley, 50-m backstroke); 3 world records (50-, 100-, and 200-m backstroke)
Grigory Kriss (born 1940), Ukrainian Soviet Olympic épée fencer who won four Olympic medals, including a gold medal 
 Tatiana Lysenko, USSR/Ukraine gymnast, 2x Olympic champion (balance beam, team combined exercises), bronze (horse vault)
 Valeria Maksyuta, Ukraine/Israel gymnast, multiple World Cup medalist, Israeli Olympian, Maccabiah Games champion
 Valentyn Mankin, Soviet/Ukraine, only sailor in Olympic history to win gold medals in three different classes (yachting: finn class, tempest class, and star class), silver (yachting, tempest class)
 Faina Melnik, Ukrainian-born USSR, 11 world records; Olympic discus throw champion
Andriy Oberemko, soccer/football midfielder (Mariupol & U21 national team)
 Igor Olshansky, NFL American football defensive end
 Zhanna Pintusevich-Block, Ukraine, sprinter, world 100-m & 200-m champion
 Katerina Pisetsky, Israel/Ukraine, rhythmic gymnast
 Maxim Podoprigora, Ukrainian-born Austrian swimmer
 Ian Rubin, Ukraine/Australia, Russia national rugby league team
 Igor Rybak, Ukrainian-born USSR, Olympic weightlifting champion (lightweight)
 David Tyshler (1927–2014), Ukraine-born Soviet sabre fencer, Olympic bronze medalist
 Yulen Uralov (born 1924), Ukrainian Soviet Olympic foil fencer, and USSR champion
 Iosif Vitebskiy (born 1938), Soviet Ukrainian Olympic medalist and world champion épée fencer, and current US fencing coach
 Alexei Zhitnik, Ukraine-born Russia, hockey defenseman (NHL)

Politicians

 Mykhailo Dobkin, former governor of Kharkiv Oblast 2010-2014
 Volodymyr Groysman, former Prime Minister of Ukraine (2016–2019)
 Hennadiy Kernes,  Mayor of Kharkiv 2010–2020
 Ihor Kolomoyskyi, former Governor of Dnipropetrovsk Oblast 2014-2015
 Pinhas Krasny, Ukrainian minister of Jewish Affairs for the Directorate of Ukraine
 Vadim Rabinovich, 2014 presidential candidate
 Moisei Rafes, deputy secretary of National Affairs (Jewish Affairs) for the General Secretariat
 Abraham Revutsky, Ukrainian minister of Jewish Affairs for the Directorate of Ukraine
 Volodymyr Zelenskyy, President of Ukraine (2019–present)
 Moishe Zilberfarb, deputy secretary of National Affairs (Jewish Affairs) for the General Secretariat
 Alexander Zolotarev, state controller for the General Secretariat
 Yukhym Zvyahilsky, former Prime Minister of Ukraine 1993-1994 and entrepreneur
 Oleksandr Feldman, People's Deputy of Ukraine (2002–present)

Russian/Soviet politicians
 Karl Radek, Soviet politician
 Grigory Sokolnikov, Bolshevik politician
Abram Slutsky, headed the Soviet foreign intelligence service (INO), then part of the NKVD
 Leon Trotsky, Soviet politician, the founder of the Red Army, commissar (Soviet minister) of Foreign Affairs
Lazar Kaganovich, Stalinist politician and one of the organizers of the Ukrainian Holodomor and Stalinist Great Purge
 Moisei Uritsky, Soviet politician, chekist
 Grigory Yavlinsky, Russian politician, head of a liberal "Yabloko" party (half Jewish)
 Grigory Zinoviev, Soviet politician

Israeli politicians
 Yitzhak Ben-Zvi, second President of Israel (1952–63)
 Shmuel Dayan, Zionist activist, Israeli politician
 Levi Eshkol, Israeli Prime Minister (1963–69)
 Ephraim Katzir, fourth President of Israel (1973–78)
 Golda Meir, Israeli Prime Minister (1969–74)
 Natan Sharansky, Israeli politician
 Moshe Sharett, Israeli Prime Minister (1954–55)

United States politicians
 Kirill Reznik, US Politician, Member, Maryland House of Delegates (2007–Present)

Israeli military persons
 Yaakov Dori, first Chief of Staff of the Israel Defense Forces (IDF) (1948–1949); President of Technion.
 Tzvi Tzur, sixth Chief of Staff of the Israel Defense Forces (1961–1964)

Soldiers and Revolutionaries
 Pavel Axelrod, Menshevik, Marxist revolutionary
 Yakov Blumkin, Soviet spy 
 Naftali Botwin, revolutionary terrorist
 Morris Childs (born Moishe Chilovsky), American communist and spy
 Leo Deutsch, revolutionary
 Raya Dunayevskaya, founder of Marxist humanism in the U.S.
 Israel Fisanovich, World War II submarine commander and Hero of the Soviet Union
 Grigory Goldenberg, revolutionary
 Ze'ev Jabotinsky, founder of British Jewish Legion 
 Jacob Golos, Soviet spy
 Olga Kameneva, Russian Bolshevik revolutionary and a Soviet politician (sister of Leon Trotsky) 
 Walter Krivitsky (born Samuel Ginsberg), Soviet spy
 Alexander Parvus, revolutionary, major investor and financial supporter of the October Revolution
 Sidney Reilly (born Shlomo Rosenblum), a Ukrainian-born adventurer and Secret Intelligence Service agent 
 Pinhas Rutenberg, Zionist, Social revolutionary
 Grigori Shtern (Grigory Stern), Red Army commander (Colonel General)
 Naum Sorkin, Red Army military intelligence chief in the Far East (Major-General)
 V. Volodarsky (born Moisei Goldstein), communist revolutionary
 Mark Zborowski, Soviet spy
 Iona Yakir, Red Army commander and one of the world's major military reformers between World War I and World War II
 Mishka Yaponchik, gangster, leader of the Odessa Jewish Resistance group in 1917-1921

Other Historical figures
 Michael Dorfman, Russian-Israeli essayist and human rights activist
 Yisroel ben Eliezer (The Baal Shem Tov), Rabbi, founder of Hasidic Judaism
 Shlomo Ganzfried, Rabbi
 Fanny Kaplan, would-be assassin of Lenin
 Menachem Mendel Schneerson, Rebbe of the Chabad-Lubavitch branch of Hasidic Judaism
 Isroel Shmulson, architect
 Simon Wiesenthal, a Nazi hunter

Business figures
 Jan Koum, co-founder of WhatsApp
 Leon Bagrit, pioneer of automation
 Zino Davidoff
 Bernard Delfont, impresario
 Lew Grade, founder of ATV
 Ihor Kolomoyskyi, a major Ukrainian business oligarch
 Max Levchin, co-founder of PayPal
 Hryhoriy Surkis, head of public organization Football Federation of Ukraine, Ukrainian parliamentary
 Viktor Vekselberg, billionaire, steelmaker
 Gennadiy Korban, Ukrainian businessman, Member of the Board of Trustees of the Jewish community of Dnipro, Patron of the Jewish community of Krivoy Rog
Boris Lohzkin, President of the Jewish Confederation of Ukraine

Natural scientists
 Aleksander Akhiezer, physicist
 Matvei Petrovich Bronstein
 Mikhail Gurevich
 Waldemar Haffkine, biologist, developed vaccine against cholera and plague
 Boris Hessen, physicist
 Abram Ioffe, nuclear scientist
 Isaak Markovich Khalatnikov
 Veniamin Levich, electrochemist
 Boris Podolsky
 Isaak Pomeranchuk
 Jacob Rabinow
 Anatol Rapoport
 Grigory Shajn
 Iosif Shklovsky
 Vladimir Veksler
 Alexander Vilenkin, cosmologist

 Selman Waksman, biochemist, Nobel Prize (1952)

Mathematicians
 Naum Akhiezer, mathematician 
 Vladimir Arnold, mathematician 
 Chudnovsky brothers
 Vladimir Drinfeld
 Felix Gantmacher
 Israel Gelfand
 Alexander Goncharov
 Marc Kac, mathematician
 Naum Krasner
 Mark Krasnosel'skii
 Mark Krein
 Evgenii Landis
 Boris Levin
 Leonid Levin
 Boris Levitan
 Jacob Levitzki
 David Milman
 Vitali Milman
 Pierre Milman
 Mark Naimark
 Moses Schönfinkel
 Samuil Shatunovsky
 Pavel Urysohn

Social scientists
 Solomon Buber, Hebraist
 Ariel Durant, historian,
 Boris Eichenbaum, historian
 Mikhail Epstein, literary theorist
 Moshe Feldenkrais, inventor of the Feldenkrais method
 Alexander Gerschenkron, economic historian
 Jean Gottmann, geographer
 Zellig Harris
 Jacob Marschak, economist
 Elye Spivak

Musicians
 Sophia Agranovich, pianist
 Simon Barere, pianist
Felix Blumenfeld, pianist
Shura Cherkassky, pianist
Mark Donskoy, Soviet  film director
Isaak Dunayevsky, composer
 Mischa Elman, violinist
 Anthony Fedorov, singer, American Idol finalist
 Samuil Feinberg, composer
 Emil Gilels, pianist
Maria Grinberg, pianist
Mordechai Hershman, cantor and singer
Jascha Horenstein, conductor
Vladimir Horowitz, pianist
Leonid Kogan, violinist
Mikhail Kopelman, violinist
Oleg Maisenberg, pianist
 Samuel Maykapar, composer/pianist
Nathan Milstein, violinist
Benno Moiseiwitsch, pianist
David Oistrakh, violinist
 Igor Oistrakh, violinist
Leo Ornstein, composer
Gregor Piatigorsky, cellist
Pokrass brothers, composers
Mark Reizen, operatic bass
Yossele Rosenblatt, cantor and composer
Heinrich Schenker, music theorist
Joseph Schillinger, composer, music theorist, and composition teacher
 Leo Sirota, pianist 
 Isaac Stern, violinist 
Roman Turovsky-Savchuk, lutenist-composer
Lyubov Uspenskaya, singer
Yakov Zak, pianist

Fine artists
Michael Matusevitch (1929–2007), painter
Nathan Altman, painter and stage designer
Boris Aronson, painter and designer
Nudie Cohn, fashion designer
Sonia Delaunay, painter
Maya Deren, filmmaker
Boris Efimov, cartoonist
Naum Gabo, sculptor
Boris Iofan, architect
Ilya Kabakov, conceptualist artist
Yevgeny Khaldei, photographer
Jacob Kramer, painter
Morris Lapidus, architect
Louise Nevelson, sculptor
Solomon Nikritin
Jules Olitski, painter
Leonid Pasternak, painter
Antoine Pevsner, sculptor
Olga Rapay-Markish (1929–2012), ceramicist
Mikhail Turovsky, painter
Roman Turovsky, painter

Performing artists
 Jacob Adler, actor
 Yosl Cutler, puppeteer
 Abraham Goldfaden (1840–1908), playwright and theatre director
Alexander Granach (1890–1945), actor in theater and film (Berlin & Germany, Poland, USSR, Hollywood and Broadway)
Aleksei Kapler, film artist
 Mila Kunis, actress 
Anatole Litvak, director
 Alla Nazimova, actress
 Otto Preminger, director, producer, actor
 Ingo Preminger, producer, literary agent
 Elena Ralph, model
 Yakov Smirnoff, American comedian
 Volodymyr Zelenskyy, Ukrainian screenwriter, actor, comedian, and director, who was elected the President of Ukraine in the 2019 Ukrainian presidential election.

Writers and poets
 Sholom Aleichem, Yiddish-language writer
 Eli Schechtman, Yiddish writer
 Isaac Babel, writer
 Eduard Bagritsky, poet
 Hayyim Nahman Bialik, poet
 Yosef Haim Brenner, Hebrew-language writer
 Sasha Cherny, poet
 Michael Dorfman, journalist and essayist
 Moysey Fishbein, poet
 Ilya Ehrenburg, writer
 Alexander Galich, playwright poet
Asher Hirsch Ginsberg (Ahad Ha'Am), Hebrew-language writer
 Lydia Ginzburg, writer
 Jacob Gordin, American playwright
 Erol Güney, journalist and translator
 Vasily Grossman, writer
 Ilya Ilf, writer
 Vera Inber, poet
 Alejandro Jodorowsky, Spanish-language writer and filmmaker
A.M. Klein, poet
Pavel Kogan, poet
Lev Kopelev, author and dissident
Clarice Lispector, writer from Brazil
Benedikt Livshits, writer
Nadezhda Mandelstam, writer
Yunna Morits, poet
 Anatoli Rybakov, writer
Boris Slutsky, war-time poet
 Shaul Tchernichovsky, poet and translator

Chess players
 Alexander Beliavsky
 Ossip Bernstein
 Isaac Boleslavsky
 David Bronstein, World Championship challenger
 Iossif Dorfman
Louis Eisenberg
 Alexander Evensohn
 Efim Geller
 Eduard Gufeld
 Ilya Gurevich
 Mikhail Gurevich
 Nicolai Jasnogrodsky
 Gregory Kaidanov
 Alexander Konstantinopolsky
 Konstantin Lerner
 Moishe Lowtzky
 Vladimir Malaniuk
 Sam Palatnik
 Ernest Pogosyants
 Iosif Pogrebyssky
 Leonid Stein
 Mark Taimanov
 Boris Verlinsky
 Yakov Vilner

See also
History of the Jews in Ukraine
List of Galician Jews
List of Jews born in the former Russian Empire

References

Lists of Jews
Ukraine
Jews
 
Jews,Ukrainian